The following railroads have been called Florida Northern Railroad:
Florida Northern Railroad (defunct), a former railroad north of Jacksonville, Florida
Florida Northern Railroad (current), a short line railroad near Ocala, Florida